Bergin is a surname. Notable people with the surname include:

 James Bergin, Irish recipient of the Victoria Cross
 John Daniel Bergin, New Zealand neurologist
 Mary Bergin, Irish folk musician
 Michael Bergin, American model
 Osborn Bergin, Irish Celticist
 Patricia Bergin, Australian judge
 Patrick Bergin, Irish actor
 Thomas Bergin, scholar translator 
 Thomas Fleming Bergin, Early railway engineer and manager
Eily Bergin, character in the Northern Irish film Breakfast on Pluto (2005) and the novel of the same name from which it is based

See also
 Diane Bergin, Consultant Radiologist, Professor of Radiology, Galway, Ireland.
 Tom Bergin's, a tavern in Los Angeles, California

Surnames of Irish origin